Choaspes subcaudata, commonly known as the blue awlking, is a species of butterfly belonging to the family Hesperiidae. It is found in Asia, Malaysia and Borneo. The species was first described by Baron Cajetan von Felder and Rudolf Felder in 1867.

Subspecies
Choaspes subcaudata subcaudata
Choaspes subcaudata crawfurdi (Distant, 1882) (southern Burma, Thailand, Laos, Peninsular Malaysia, Singapore, Borneo, Sumatra, Nias)

References

Coeliadinae
Butterflies of Asia
Butterflies described in 1867
Taxa named by Baron Cajetan von Felder
Taxa named by Rudolf Felder